Pycnorhachis is a monotypic genus of flowering plants belonging to the family Apocynaceae. The only species is Pycnorhachis maingayi.

Its native range is Peninsula Malaysia.

References

Apocynaceae
Monotypic Apocynaceae genera